Palaina arborfumosa, also known as the Smoking Tree staircase snail, is a species of staircase snail that is endemic to Australia's Lord Howe Island in the Tasman Sea.

Description
The globose pupiform shell of adult snails is 5.6–6.3 mm in height, with a diameter of 3.2–3.5 mm. It is pale golden- to orange-brown in colour, with a conical spire and closely spaced ribs.

Habitat
The snail is most common in the central part of the island, especially Intermediate Hill, Smoking Tree Ridge and Soldier's Creek, with a few records from elsewhere.

References

 
arborfumosa
Gastropods of Lord Howe Island
Gastropods described in 2010